Aibel may refer to:

Aibel, a service company
Anthony Aibel, an American actor and musical director
Jonathan Aibel, an American screenwriter